Sam's Song is a 1969 drama film directed by Jordan Leondopoulos and starring Robert De Niro.

Footage from Sam's Song was later re-edited into a completely different film, known as both The Swap and Line of Fire, in which a man investigates the death of his brother (released 1979).

Plot
A political filmmaker finds himself in Long Island for a weekend where he finds himself entangled with a high-living, jet set crowd. At first it is exciting, but soon he finds himself disillusioned by their shallowness.

See also
 List of American films of 1969

References

External links

1969 films
1969 drama films
American drama films
Golan-Globus films
1960s English-language films
1960s American films